Patrick Hayden may refer to:  

 Patrick Nielsen Hayden, author and editor of science fiction
 Patrick Hayden (scientist), physicist and information theorist

See also